The Asian blue tick (Rhipicephalus (Boophilus) microplus, Rhipicephalus microplus, or Boophilus microplus) is an economically important tick that parasitises a variety of livestock species especially cattle, on which it is the most economically significant ectoparasite in the world. It is known as the Australian cattle tick, southern cattle tick, Cuban tick, Madagascar blue tick, and Puerto Rican Texas fever tick.

It is classified as a hard tick in the family Ixodidae. It is a small teardrop-shaped arachnid with a hardened plate called the scutum covering its head. Males are entirely covered in scutum on their backs with additional plates called festoons along their sides. The body can be brown or pale in nymphs and darkens as the tick matures. Adults have 8 cream-colored legs.

In R. microplus the hypostome has a hexagonal base which can be used as an identifying characteristic. The shape and length of the hypostome is determined by the host a particular tick species or subspecies feeds on. Ticks may be identified by the arrangement of hair-like structures called setae. In R. microplus the setae are arranged in rows of 3 along the ticks body behind the scutum.

Parasitism
Rhipicephalus microplus is best known for being a cattle parasite. However, it has also been discovered in a number of other animal hosts such as domestic water buffalo, wild and domestic goats, horses, wild pigs, various rat species, and humans.

R. microplus serves as a vector for numerous pathogens, most notably Babesia bigemina and B. bovis. B. bigemina and B. bovis are responsible for bovine babesiosis which is ranked as the most economically important arthropod-transmitted illness in cattle. Bovine babesiosis is characterized by anemia, fever, and potentially multiple organ failure. This results in weight loss and lower milk production in infected cattle and therefore, massive economic losses in countries like Brazil where 80% of the cattle population is infected. R. microplus has also been shown to be a vector for Ehrlichia ruminantium in West Africa. E. ruminantium causes fluid buildup around the heart in cattle and other species, a condition with an 80% mortality rate, causing significant economic damage in infected areas.

Distribution
Rhipicephalus microplus was originally found in the tropical and sub-tropical forests of India. However, due to the centuries-long movement of cattle around Europe, R. microplus has dramatically spread from its original range, making it to the United States between 4 and 5 centuries ago. R. microplus is generally found between 32°N and 32°S, a region strongly overlapping with major cattle breeding countries and territories.

Nearly a cosmopolitan species, Asian blue tick is found specifically in Costa Rica, Anguilla, Antigua and Barbuda, Brazil, Bahamas, Barbados, Belize, Bolivia, Argentina, Colombia, Cote D'Ivoire, Cuba, Dominica, Ecuador, El Salvador, Ethiopia, French Guiana, Guadeloupe, Guam, Guatemala, Guyana, Honduras, India, Indonesia, Jamaica, Libya, Madagascar, Malawi, Martinique, Mexico, Montserrat, Mozambique, Nicaragua, Panama, Paraguay, Peru, Puerto Rico, Saint Kitts and Nevis, Saint Lucia, Saint Vincent and the Grenadines, South Africa, Sri Lanka, Suriname, Tanzania, Trinidad and Tobago, Uganda, Uruguay, Venezuela, Vietnam, Virgin Islands (U.S.), Zambia and Zimbabwe.

Tick populations in Australia once thought to belong to R. microplus are now recognized to belong to R. australis, which was reinstated as a sibling species of R. microplus in 2012.

Having formerly been present in the United States, it has since been eradicated there, except for sporadic occurrences in a buffer zone along the Mexican border.

In Louisiana, Governor Ruffin Pleasant in 1917 signed legislation sponsored by freshman State Senator Norris C. Williamson of East Carroll Parish to authorize state funding to eradicate the cattle tick.

Life cycle
The life cycle of R. microplus has been examined under laboratory conditions using rabbit hosts. The average life cycle was determined to be approximately 65 days. The life cycle begins with an adult female which feeds for approximately 7 days before entering a 4 day pre-oviposition period. During pre-oviposition a female will mate with any and all males who present themselves. The female tick then spends 8.6 days in oviposition, during which time she will lay her eggs. On average, each female lays about 1450 eggs per brood. The eggs take about 21 days to hatch. Approximately 83.5% will survive to hatch into a free-living larval stage which lasts for 3.5 days. The larvae have their first feeding at this time, and their first molt 8 days later. At this point, the larvae have become nymphs. They will feed for 11 days before becoming adults.

Control

Management efforts in the United States began after R. microplus was deemed responsible for an estimated $63 billion in damages during the early 19th century. A control campaign began in 1906 and by 1943 it was considered complete, having eradicated most of the tick population other than a small region along the Southern US border. In the modern day, the standard form of control is spraying of acaricides: a type of pesticide that targets ticks and mites. Overuse of acaricides has resulted in some R. microplus populations developing resistance, and it is now considered the most resistant tick ever. Other control methods include ivermectin, a common anti-parasitic. In Mexico, it has been shown that R. microplus populations are developing varying levels of resistance to ivermectin, meaning this treatment is becoming less effective year over year.

Vaccinating cattle against R. microplus was considered as another option, however, the original Bm86-based vaccines have shown limited efficacy against R. microplus as compared to other tick species.

Acaricides and pyrethroids are commonly used however this has led to the development of acaricide- and pyrethroid- resistances. Acaricide resistance in R. microplus is mediated by para sodium channel mutants. Such alleles can be rapidly detected in a border livestock inspection by PCR+High Resolution Melt testing. This is especially useful on the United States-Mexico border where the US has almost eradicated R. microplus, but Mexico has a high prevalence and a high prevalence of acaricide resistance. This technique could also be applied in other countries where pyrethroid resistant R. microplus is a common problem.

Some populations of R. microplus have developed resistance to acetylcholinesterase inhibitors. The search for the acetylcholinesterase (AChE) mutations responsible has been stymied because, although there are only three AChEs in this genome, all three have a high copy number. Progress has been made by Bellgard et al., 2012, Temeyer et al., 2012, and Bendele et al., 2015 toward identifying resistance alleles.

Another management option that has shown promise is the use of pasture rotation. This is based on knowledge of the R. microplus life cycle. A large pasture is divided up into multiple regions that cattle are moved between regularly. The rotation time is based on the time it takes the R. microplus eggs to hatch. If timed correctly, the larvae in an area only become viable after the cattle have moved, leading to loss of that R. microplus generation. This has been shown to be effective in reducing the tick population. However, the amount of time a pasture needs to remain empty means it isn't generally economically viable for farmers.

See also 
 Ticks of domestic animals

References

Further reading 
<ref>La especie Rhipicephalus (Boophilus) microplus (Acari-Ixodidae) Canestrini, 1888  conocida comúnmente como la garrapata común del bovino, es sin dudas la más dañina de las garrapatas y el más dañino de los ectoparásitos, que afectan al ganado bovino, ya que provoca daños en la piel, anemias, baja condición física, alteraciones reproductivas, decrecimiento en la producción de leche y carne, mortalidad de los animales y parálisis. Además es agente transmisor de hemoparásitos <r<NCBI. National Center for Biotechnology Information. NCBI Taxonomy browser https://www.ncbi.nlm.nih.gov/taxonomy/?term=ixodidae.></Barker, S. Murrel, A. 2008. Systematics and evolution of ticks with a list of valid genus and species names. Ticks: Biology disease and control Eds. A. Bowman y P. Nuttal. Cambridge University Press. 39 p.>Nari, A. 1995. Strategies for the control of one-host ticks and relationship with tick-borne diseases in South America. Veterinary Parasitology. 57:153-165></ref>

External links 
A revision of two distinct species of Rhipicephalus: R. microplus and R. australis

Ticks
Animals described in 1888
Parasitic arthropods of mammals
Arachnids of Asia
Ixodidae